Kamptobaatar is a Mongolian mammal genus from the Upper Cretaceous. It lived at the same time as the later dinosaurs. This animal was a member of the extinct order Multituberculata within the suborder Cimolodonta and family Sloanbaataridae.

The genus Kamptobaatar ("bent hero") was named by Zofia Kielan-Jaworowska in 1970 based on a single species. "Bent" refers to the observable bend of the zygomatic arches in the skull.

Fossil remains of the species Kamptobaatar kuczynskii are known from the Upper Cretaceous Djadokhta Formation of Mongolia.

References 

 Much of this information has been derived from MESOZOIC MAMMALS: Djadochtatherioidea, an Internet directory.

Cimolodonts
Late Cretaceous mammals of Asia
Taxa named by Zofia Kielan-Jaworowska
Prehistoric mammal genera